Katrine Philp (born December 14, 1978) is a Danish film director. She initially studied film production design at the Royal Danish Academy of Fine Arts and later 
graduated from the National Film School of Denmark as a documentary film director in 2009.

Career
Philp started her career in 2009 with her graduation film Book of Miri. The film was selected for the IDFA Student Competition and won the European Young CIVIS Media award in Germany.

Philp is a former dancer. After being invited to a ballroom training session, she met with dancers who would become the protagonists of her first feature documentary Dance For Me in 2013. The film was nominated at the 2015 Emmy Awards in the category ‘Outstanding Arts and Culture Programming’.

In 2018, Philp directed False Confessions. The film focuses on the defence lawyer Jane Fisher-Byrialsen, who works on false confessions cases in USA, including the ones of Korey Wise, Malthe Thomsen and Renay Lynch. Due to interrogation techniques that use brutal psychological manipulation, including lying about evidence, to secure a confession, they have falsely confessed to crimes they didn't commit. The film won the Special Jury Award for Excellence in Social Justice at Los Angeles Film Festival in 2018.

Philp directed in 2020 the documentary Beautiful Something Left Behind, which follows young children during a period of their grief, as they just lost one or both parents.

The film was previously called An Elephant in the Room and was part of the main competition in the 2020 SXSW Film Festival under this title. Although the festival was cancelled due to the COVID-19 pandemic, the competition took place and Philp won the Grand Jury Prize for Best Documentary.

Personal life
Philp is married to the cinematographer Adam Morris Philp whom she has made several films with, including Beautiful Something Left Behind. For this film, they spend a year following the kids and moved their children in New Jersey for the filming. During this period, Philp's dad died unexpectedly. 
Filming kids going through grief and experiencing a similar loss helped her going through her own grief. Philp dedicated the film to her father.

Filmography
Beautiful Something Left Behind (also known as “An Elephant in the Room”) (2020) – Film Director
False Confessions (2018) - Film Director
Home Sweet Home (2015) - Film Director 
Dance For Me (2013) - Film Director 
Suitable (2013) - Film Director 
Book of Miri (2009) - Film director

Awards

References

External links
 
 
 Katrine Philp at the Danish Film Institute

1978 births
Living people
Royal Danish Academy of Fine Arts alumni
Danish women film directors
Film directors from Copenhagen
Danish documentary film directors